The 1977 Paris–Nice was the 35th edition of the Paris–Nice cycle race and was held from 10 March to 17 March 1977. The race started in Paris and finished in Nice. The race was won by Freddy Maertens of the Flandria team.

General classification

References

1977
1977 in road cycling
1977 in French sport
March 1977 sports events in Europe
1977 Super Prestige Pernod